Roughwood, originally known as Lamb's Tavern, is a historic home located at Devon, Easttown Township, Chester County, Pennsylvania. It consists of three sections.  The oldest section was built in 1819, on the foundations of an earlier log structure dated to about 1805.  It is constructed of green serpentine ashlar and coated in stucco.  The dining room wing was added in 1821–1822, when the house was used as a tavern.  The third wing is the kitchen wing, with later service room additions. The house has a number of Federal style design details.  It was extensively renovated and modernized in 1928, under the direction of architect R. Brognard Okie (1875-1945).

It was added to the National Register of Historic Places in 1984.

References

Houses on the National Register of Historic Places in Pennsylvania
Federal architecture in Pennsylvania
Houses completed in 1805
Houses in Chester County, Pennsylvania
1805 establishments in Pennsylvania
National Register of Historic Places in Chester County, Pennsylvania